O'Sullivan Peak is an ice-covered peak, 1,765 m, which forms the highest point and is near the south end of a north–south trending ice-covered ridge, standing 11 nautical miles (20 km) west of the north arm of Odom Inlet, on the east coast of Palmer Land. The peak was photographed from the air by the United States Antarctic Service (USAS) in December 1940, and was probably seen by the expedition's ground party that explored this coast. First charted by a joint party consisting of members of the Ronne Antarctic Research Expedition (RARE) and the Falkland Islands Dependencies Survey (FIDS) in 1947. Named by the FIDS for T.P. O'Sullivan, a member of the FIDS at the Hope Bay base in 1946–47.

Mountains of Palmer Land